The Bowl (also Chief Bowls); John Watts Bowles (Cherokee: Di'wali) (ca. 1756 – July 16, 1839) was one of the leaders of the Chickamauga Cherokee during the Cherokee–American wars, served as a Principal Chief of the Cherokee Nation–West, and was a leader of the Texas Cherokees (Tshalagiyi nvdagi).

Early life
Di'wali was born around 1756 in Little Hiwassee, a Cherokee town in current-day North Carolina near Tomotla. His mother was mixed blood Cherokee, Ghigoneli Boles, and his father was a Scottish trader John Watts. Emmet Starr, an early historian of the Cherokee, describes Bowles as "being decidedly Gaelic in appearance, having light eyes, red hair, and somewhat freckled."  At the age of 11, when his maternal Grandfather John Knight Boles was murdered, he tracked down the men and killed them.  In tradition of Indian naming patterns he took the name of Boles becoming John Watts Boles.  The Osage word for Bowl is Diwali which is what history has recorded him as.

Young warrior
Di'wali was a follower of Dragging Canoe, one of the founders of the Chickamauga Cherokee who supported the British during the American Revolutionary War.  He fought under Dragging Canoe and John Watts during the Cherokee-American wars. During this time, Di'wali had become the chief of the Running Water Town (present-day Whiteside, Tennessee).  After the destruction of the Chickamauga settlements by the Americans in 1794, Di'wali returned to Little Hiwassee.

On the move
In order to enjoy better hunting grounds and escape the pressures of growing white settlements in the southern states, Di'wali led the first large Cherokee emigration west across the Mississippi River in 1794, where he and his followers established a settlement in the Louisiana Territory along the St. Francis River (near present-day New Madrid, Missouri).  Continued problems with the Osage resulted in efforts to get the Shawnee and Delaware to relocate to Arkansas as well.  The Osage name for Bowl was Duwali. When the tribal government was organized in 1809 with the arrival of additional Old Settlers, he was elected the first Principal Chief of the Cherokee Nation–West.  In 1812-13, Di'wali moved the people south near present-day Conway, Arkansas.  Di'wali was succeeded as the Principal Chief of the Cherokee Nation–West in 1813 by Degadoga.

Responding to the influx of white settlers into the Arkansaw Territory, in the winter of 1819-1820 Di'wali led about 60 Cherokee families into Spanish Texas, settling for two years in northeast Texas along the Red River.  The community elected Di'wali as Head Chief (ugu).  With the influx of white settlers into the Red River area, Di'wali once again moved his community, this time to the valley of the Trinity River, near where present-day Dallas lies. They moved again the following year into a region fifty miles north of present-day Nacogdoches, Texas.  At this time, Richard Fields succeeded D'wali as the leader of the "Cherokee and their associated bands."

After entering into a November 8, 1822 agreement with José Felix Trespalacios, the governor of the Province of Tejas, calling for "peaceful possession" of lands in east Texas, Fields and Di'wali traveled to Mexico City the following winter, and petitioned the Mexican government for a treaty to be allowed to permanently settle there.  In his 1898 essay, "the Cherokee Nation of Indians," V. O. King reports:

Enforcement of the 1822 agreement with Mexico was difficult, and on April 15, 1825, a white immigrant, Benjamin Edwards, was given a grant by the Mexican government to settle in Cherokee claimed lands in east Texas.  The dissatisfaction with the Mexican authorities found an outlet when a number of aggrieved white settlers in nearby Nacogdoches revolted against the Mexican government in what became known as the Fredonian Rebellion.  While Fields, as red (or war) chief, and John Dunn Hunter, as white (or peace) chief, together opened negotiations with the Fredonian leaders, Di'wali urged the Cherokee not to cooperate with the rebels. He believed that loyalty to Mexico would lead to final enforcement of the 1822 treaty and recognition of the Cherokee land claims. Di'wali was convincing, and the Cherokee remained loyal to Mexico during the rebellion.  Fields and Hunter were executed by the Mexican government on May 8, 1827 for their support of the Fredonian Rebellion, and Di'wali succeeded Fields as war chief.

Attempts to secure land rights
In remaining loyal to Mexico, Stephen F. Austin and other Mexican officials praised Di'wali and the Cherokee in the wake of the Fredonian Rebellion. Di'wali was summoned to Nacogdoches and given a commission of lieutenant-colonel in the Mexican Army on July 19, 1827. During this time, Di'wali continued to work toward securing a written guarantee of rights over the Cherokee lands from the Mexican government, but the Mexican government repeatedly withheld written agreement.  By 1830, an estimated 800 Cherokee lived in up to seven settlements in Texas. They became known as the Texas Cherokee, or Tsalagiyi nvdagi.

When the Texas Revolution came, the Texas Cherokee decided to remain neutral, but Sam Houston (who had married into the Cherokee tribe and had a long-standing relationship with Chief Di'wali) sought an alliance with the Cherokee. Seeking to give them what the Mexican government had refused and empowered under authority of the new government, General Houston negotiated a treaty with the Cherokee and other associated groups, granting over 2.5 million acres of land in east Texas:

Given the prospect of finally having a secure homeland, the Cherokee agreed, and Di'wali signed the treaty on behalf of the Texas Cherokees near present-day Alto, Texas on February 23, 1835.  Consequently, the Texas Cherokee remained supportive of the Texans against Santa Anna.  On December 20, 1836, within the first two months as President of the Republic of Texas, Sam Houston told the Texas Senate, I "most earnestly recommend [the treaty with the Cherokee]'s ratification. You will find upon examining this treaty, that it is just and equitable, and perhaps the best which could be made at present time."  The Senate of the Republic of Texas, however, refused to ratify the treaty, citing that the Cherokee had not actively fought with Texans in the revolution and that the treaty conflicted with a grant given to David G. Burnet.  Over Houston's objections, the Senate formally nullified the treaty on December 16, 1837. Almost immediately, the Land Office began issuing patents to lands within the Cherokee lands.

Though the relations between the Texas Cherokee and the Republic of Texas was strained, Houston and Di'wali remained close friends, and Di'wali served—at Houston's request—as a representative of the Texas government in negotiations with the Comanche in the western plains.  In a further attempt to secure permanent recognition of Indian lands in east Texas, Di'wali again looked to Mexico when Vicente Córdova attempted an insurgency against the Republic of Texas. The government of Mexico sought an arrangement with the Cherokee for their support in an insurgency in exchange for title to their land. Di'wali permitted Córdova's militia to operate within Cherokee lands in 1838.  When a member of the Córdova militia had been killed in May 1839, documents were uncovered by Texas officials that suggested a conspiracy between the pro-Mexican forces and the Texas Cherokee. Though the Córdova Rebellion had been suppressed quickly, coming to a head in August 1838, the newly discovered documents led the new President of the Republic of Texas, Mirabeau Lamar, to make charges in December 1838 that Di'wali had surreptitiously collaborated with Córdova.

Conflict with Texas Republic
In 1839, in his first formal address as president, Lamar urged that the Cherokee and Comanche tribes be driven from their lands in Texas, believing that the “total extinction" of the Indian tribes was necessary to make the lands available to whites.  Lamar instructed the Texas military to construct a military post on the Great Sabine (in the southwest corner of present-day Smith County), with Di'wali warning that such a move would provoke a violent response.  Lamar sent word that the Cherokee were to depart or suffer removal by force, but Di'wali was resolute that Texas should honor its 1836 treaty.  John H. Reagan, an emissary of Lamar's administration, met with Di'wali in early July, delivering Lamar's charges and providing a few days for Di'wali to consult with his Council.

Of the second meeting with Di'wali, Reagan writes:

Final fight and last stand
On July 14, Lamar sent troops, under the command of Gen. Thomas Rusk, to occupy the Indian territory. Fleeing their town and forced northward into present-day Van Zandt County, the Cherokee halted on July 15 and prepared defenses at the Neches River.  On the morning of July 16, though severely outnumbered, Di'wali confronted his pursuers.  Di'wali "exhorted the Indians to fight bravely. During the last battle he could be heard repeatedly encouraging them, and more than once urging them to charge."  But eventually, with his troops depleted of ammunition, Di'wali ordered retreat, although he remained.  Sitting on his horse, wearing a military hat and sword given to him by Sam Houston, Di'wali faced the advancing Texans. The Texan forces shot his horse and then injured the chief, shooting him in the thigh and the back. Unable to walk but raising himself to a sitting position on the ground, Di'wali was singing a war song when Capt. Robert W. Smith approached Di'wali and shot him in the head.  Smith then took the sword from D'wali's body and swaths of skin from his arm as souvenir.

Of Di'wali, John H. Reagan recalls, "I had witnessed his dignity and manliness in council, his devotion to his tribe in sustaining their decision for war against his judgement, and his courage in battle." As he had requested, Di'wali was left on the battlefield according to tradition. A historical marker now stands at the site of Chief Di'wali 's death. A funeral for Di'wali was held by the descendants of the tribe in 1995, on the 156th anniversary of his death.

References

Sources
 
 
 
Birth of the Ozarks 1794-1839 Freda Cruse Hardison publisher Morris Publishing

External links
 Picture of The Bowl

Chickamauga Cherokee
Principal Chiefs of the Cherokee Nation (1794–1907)
1750s births
Year of birth uncertain
1839 deaths
18th-century Native Americans